Patriarch Callinicus may refer to:

 Callinicus I of Constantinople, Ecumenical Patriarch in 693–705
 Callinicus II of Constantinople, Ecumenical Patriarch in 1688, 1689–1693 and 1694–1702
 Kalinik I, Serbian Patriarch in 1691–1710
 Callinicus III of Constantinople, Ecumenical Patriarch in 1726
 Callinicus IV of Constantinople, Ecumenical Patriarch in 1757
 Kalinik II, Serbian Patriarch in 1765–1766
 Patriarch Callinicus of Alexandria, Greek Patriarch of Alexandria in 1858–1861